Jameh Mosque of Sarab dates back to the 9 century AH and is located in Sarba, Imam Khomeini Street.

References

Mosques in East Azerbaijan Province
Mosque buildings with domes
National works of Iran
Sarab